The Jerusalem Center for Public Affairs (JCPA) is an Israeli research institute specializing in public diplomacy and foreign policy founded in 1976. Currently, the Jerusalem Center for Public Affairs's research portfolio consists of five primary initiatives: the Institute for Contemporary Affairs (ICA), Defensible Borders Initiative, Jerusalem in International Diplomacy, Iran and the New Threats to the West, and Combating Delegitimization. More broadly, the think-tank concentrates on the topics of Iran, Radical Islam, the Middle East, Israel, the Peace Process, Jerusalem, Anti-Semitism, and World Jewry. Its publications include the academic journal Jewish Political Studies Review and the email-distributed Daily Alert, a daily regional news summary. The research institute is a registered non-profit organization and produces content in English, Hebrew, French, and German.

The JCPA is considered to be politically neo-conservative. It is being financed to a large degree by Sheldon Adelson, a steadfast supporter of Jewish settlement of the West Bank.

History
The Jerusalem Center for Public Affairs was established in 1978 by Daniel Elazar as an umbrella organization encompassing the Center for Jewish Community Studies and the Jerusalem Institute for Federal Studies. Elazar personally raised most of the funds for the operation of the organization and the restoration of an historic building on Tel Hai Street in Jerusalem, named in honor of the Milken family. The building, Beit Milken, served as the Embassy of Uruguay from 1957 to 1980, when Uruguay decided to move their embassy to Tel Aviv. In 1989, the 1,200 ton building was moved 16 meters on rails to reach the site it currently occupies.

Dr. Dore Gold, Israel's former ambassador to the UN and former foreign policy adviser to Prime Minister Benjamin Netanyahu, headed the Jerusalem Center from 2000 to 2015, when he took a leave of absence to become director-general of the Israeli Ministry of Foreign Affairs. Gold returned as president of the Jerusalem Center.

Political orientation
The JCPA has been described as neo-conservative. It has been headed since 2000 by "Netanyahu confidante" Dore Gold. In 2015 Haaretz identified Sheldon Adelson as "one of the main financers of JCPA in recent years"; Adelson is an American billionaire casino magnate, staunch supporter of Jewish settlement of the West Bank and biggest contributor to US Republicans in the 2018 US midterm elections during President Donald Trump's mandate.

Self-declared policy positions

Israeli internal politics
The Jerusalem Center for Public Affairs does not comment, publish, or advocate any explicit policy decisions concerning Israeli domestic security. Accordingly, no articles, videos, or major publications on the think-tank's website will discuss political coalitions in Israel nor mention its major parties (e.g. Likud, Zionist Union, etc.).

Final status negotiations
The Jerusalem Center for Public Affairs is an organisation which largely focuses on Israeli security, regional diplomacy, and international law. The essence of the organization's positions regarding final status negotiations between Israel and the Palestinians was articulated within their Defensible Borders Initiative. A continuing project dating back to the early-2000s, the Jerusalem Center for Public Affairs has made explicit their stance on the matter, particularly in a YouTube video released in May 2010.

The think-tank is a supporter of the two-state solution calling for a "demilitarized Palestinian state" alongside Israel.

Jordan Valley
Regarding the Jordan Rift Valley, the organization is opposed to the presence of international peacekeeping troops given their poor track-record in the Gaza Strip, the Sinai Peninsula, and Southern Lebanon (see United Nations Emergency Force and United Nations Interim Force in Lebanon). Accordingly, the organization argues that Israel must retain control of the Jordan Valley. Concerning the future of the Palestinian territories, the Jerusalem Center for Public Affairs advocates for demilitarization and Israel's ability to exercise control of airspace and electromagnetic communications throughout the West Bank.

Jerusalem's final status
Research conducted by the Jerusalem Center for Public Affairs fellow Nadav Shragai, as well as, the organization's program Jerusalem in International Diplomacy maintain that Jerusalem should remain unified and under Israeli sovereignty.

Boycott, Divestment, and Sanctions (BDS) movement
The organization is opposed to, and actively seeks to undermine, the BDS movement. Another core program of the institute, Combating Delegitimization and BDS, alongside the work of Dan Diker demonstrates the movement's objectives of achieving a one-state solution, dismantling Israel, and its correlation with anti-Semitism incidents.

Publications

 Jewish Political Studies Review, a biannual academic journal that describes itself as "dedicated to the study of Jewish political institutions and behavior, Jewish political thought, and Jewish public affairs"
 Daily Alert, a daily news summary and analysis concerning Israel, Iran, radical Islam, and other regional security issues distributed through email for the Conference of Presidents of Major American Jewish Organizations
 "Changing Jewish Communities," which is less focused on global anti-Semitism and addresses issues related to global Jewish communities
 Jewish Environmental Studies, which analyzes Jewish environmental thought through the Bible and classic Jewish texts

Institutes

Institute for Contemporary Affairs
The Jerusalem Center founded the Institute for Contemporary Affairs (ICA) jointly with the Wechsler Family Foundation. The current director of the ICA is Ambassador Alan Baker. Through this outlet, the JCPA publishes Jerusalem Issue Briefs and Jerusalem Viewpoints. They also publish the twice-yearly Strategic Perspectives, special reports presenting studies on Israeli security and diplomacy topics by the Contributing Editors board of the ICA.

Institute for Global Jewish Affairs
In 2008, JCPA founded the Institute for Global Jewish Affairs in response to growing international anti-Semitism. Directed by Manfred Gerstenfeld, the institute addresses a variety of topics related to Jewish communities around the world.

The institute helps direct the "Post-Holocaust and Anti-Semitism Project" and its associated monthly publication "Post-Holocaust and Anti-Semitism," both of which attend to global anti-Semitism.

Conferences
On March 24, 2014, the Jerusalem Center held a conference entitled "Europe and Israel: A New Paradigm." The conference focused on the complicated relationship between Israel and Europe, including topics such as economics and the BDS movement, security and anti-Semitism. The conference was well attended and received a significant amount of press, including articles in The Times of Israel, The Jerusalem Post, J-Wire, Ynetnews, and CBN News.

Programs and initiatives

Combating delegitimization and BDS

A core component of the Jerusalem Center for Public Affairs concerns efforts by the Boycott, Divestment, and Sanctions (BDS) movement to delegitimize Israel. According to the organization's website, the initiative "is a major multilingual public diplomacy program" which seeks to expose those who undermine Israel's very legitimacy. This programme entails reinforcing the connection between "the Jewish people and their historical homeland including Jerusalem."

Jerusalem in international diplomacy

Jerusalem's centrality to final status negotiations between Israel and the Palestinian Authority (PA) has ensured that it is a subject which garners disproportionate scrutiny. The intermingling of religious, political, and legal dimensions has encouraged the Jerusalem Center for Public Affairs to publish extensively on the subject. Spearheaded by Nadav Shragai, the initiative has led to such publications as, Jerusalem: Delusions of Division (2015), Jerusalem: Correcting the International Discourse (2012), and The 'Al-Aksa Is in Danger Libel: The History of a Lie (2012). As outlined in the organization's policy video, the interlocking Arab and Jewish neighbourhoods of Jerusalem make division unfeasible. Mindful of Jerusalem's history during the Jordanian occupation when religious freedoms were curtailed, the Jerusalem Center for Public Affairs believes that the city must remain undivided and under Israeli sovereignty.

Iran and the New Threats to the West

This program focuses on security threats posed by Iran to Israel and the West. The program began with a publication entitled "Referral of Iranian President Ahmadinejad on the Charge of Incitement to Commit Genocide," authored by Dore Gold and Elie Wiesel, among others. The publication was created in response to multiple threats directed toward Israel by the Iranian leader, including a 2006 declaration that "Israel should be wiped off the map". The JCPA continues to monitor security threats posed by Iran in the post-Ahmadinejad era with this program.

Post-Holocaust and Anti-Semitism Project

Initiated by Dr. Manfred Gerstenfeld, the program focuses on anti-Semitism after the Holocaust and "its origins and lessons, manifestations and mutations." The initiative produces a monthly publication which addresses issues concerning past and presents acts directed against World Jewry and, among other issues, highlights anti-Israel boycotts, the manipulation of Holocaust history, and anti-Semitism emanating from Muslim and Christian communities. The program consists of conferences, seminars, lectures, interviews, and essays. As well, its content is available in English and French. The most recent publication, "Why a New Academic Discipline of Post-Holocaust Studies Should Be Established and What Its Content Should Be", argues that while the Holocaust has been instrumental in shaping modern society, its study is often confined to mass murder while its continued influence today is often neglected.

Global Law Forum

This program covers issues pertaining to Israel and international law. The goal of the program is to "protect Israel’s legal rights in its conflict with the Palestinians, the Arab world, and radical Islam." Topics include the legality of settlements, human rights, and Israeli border issues, among others. Avi Bell directs the program. Additional contributors include Robert Sabel, Ruth Lapidoth, Irit Kohn, Alan Baker, Meir Rosenne, and Justus Weiner.

See also
NGO Monitor (Non-governmental Organization Monitor), Jerusalem-based NGO, which analyzes the output of international NGOs from a pro-Israel perspective. Run between 2001-2007 by the JCPA.

References

External links
Global Law Forum
ISN: Jerusalem Center for Public Affairs
Jerusalem Center for Public Affairs

Organizations based in Jerusalem
Jewish political organizations
Jewish studies research institutes
Think tanks based in Israel
Political advocacy groups in Israel
Sheldon Adelson